I-176 may refer to:

 Interstate 176 or I-176, a road in the United States
 , a vessel of the Imperial Japanese Navy active in World War II